Wildheart is the third studio album by American R&B singer and songwriter Miguel. It was released on June 29, 2015, by Black Ice Records, ByStorm Entertainment, and RCA Records.

The album was produced by Miguel with Benny Cassette, Cashmere Cat, Benny Blanco, and Salaam Remi, among others. Certain songs found him collaborating with fellow singer Lenny Kravitz and rapper Kurupt. The music departed further from Miguel's R&B roots with rock styles such as psychedelic and new wave, as well as lyrical themes that explore morality, normalcy, and sexuality.

Wildheart charted at number two on the Billboard 200 while selling 40,000 copies in its first week. It was a widespread critical success and earned Miguel two Grammy Award nominations, including one in the category of Best Urban Contemporary Album.

Background 
In an interview with MTV, RCA Records executive Mark Pitts discussed Miguel's recording of Wildheart. "He's more confident, and it's going to show in the music, his look and in the videos", Pitts said. "Miguel is ready to push the button. His first album was about trials and tribulations. The second was OK, we’re here; I wasn't bugging. And now it's here we go. He wants people to understand who he is. He's tired of people asking who are you, what's that, 'do you like girls?' He tells me, 'I want everyone to know I am wild, funny, edgy and love women. I need this album to connect'.

Music and lyrics 

According to AllMusic's Andy Kellman, Wildhearts music is defined less by melody than by the presence of "grinding guitars and mechanical beats", played in the style of contemporary R&B and new wave rock. The Music magazine deems it an exploration into progressive soul, while Sheldon Pearce from Consequence says the album's neo soul music ranges from "psychedelic to interstellar" sounds and defies the "traditional sensibilities in modern R&B".

According to Robert Christgau, Wildheart shares more with rock music's recurring theme of struggles with normalcy and human contradiction than it does with R&B's "sin-versus-salvation struggles". Jon Pareles from The New York Times says the alluring but amoral environment of California is a recurring setting throughout the record, which explores Miguel's "clashing impulses further" than Kaleidoscope Dream (2012), "toward love and death, raunch and exaltation, doubt and confidence, salvation and damnation, cynicism and hope"; "Gonna Die Young" was written about the dangers of leading a risky lifestyle, while "...Goingtohell" explores themes of human mortality and romance. Sex-themed songs range from the wholesome narrative of "Coffee" to the pornographic "The Valley", which makes reference to the San Fernando Valley's adult entertainment industry. According to Pareles, the rock ballad "What's Normal Anyway" serves as the crux of Wildheart, as it finds Miguel contemplating his biracial heritage and feeling of rootlessness, while Christgau surmises that the song's "straightforwardly confused" lyrics properly outline Miguel's character: "He is normal—because he ain't."

Marketing and sales 
In 2014, Miguel released an EP, titled Wild, in promotion of Wildheart, featuring the songs "NWA", "Hollywood Dreams", and "Coffee". The lead single from the album was a re-worked version of the EP's track "Coffee", renamed as "Coffee (Fucking)", featuring guest vocals from American rapper Wale; it was released on May 4, 2015. Wildheart was released on June 29 by RCA Records and ByStorm Entertainment. In its first week, the album debuted at number two on the Billboard 200 and sold 40,000 copies in the United States.

Critical reception 

Wildheart was met with widespread critical acclaim. At Metacritic, which assigns a normalized rating out of 100 to reviews from mainstream publications, the album received an average score of 84, based on 27 reviews. Aggregator AnyDecentMusic? gave it 7.6 out of 10, based on their assessment of the critical consensus.

Reviewing the album for Rolling Stone, Will Hermes found it "even bolder" sonically than Kaleidoscope Dream, while Q deemed Miguel's take on R&B and rock "quixotic". In Entertainment Weekly, Kyle Anderson called Miguel's lyrics about romance and thrill in Los Angeles both exciting and balanced, while Pitchforks Anupa Mistry felt he had improved his songwriting with a sex-positive perspective that was distinct from the lustfulness of most other R&B music: "Languorous and detailed, it transcends the genre's established narratives with a focus on pleasure and partnership instead of one-sided pursuit". Jesse Cataldo of Slant Magazine compared it to D'Angelo's socially conscious album Black Messiah (2014), finding Wildheart to be "just as relevant, acknowledging the complicated realities of modern sexuality while pushing to expand its horizons". In a less enthusiastic review, NME critic Ben Cardew lamented some of the guitar elements, writing that they occasionally sounded heavy handed in the manner of arena rock. Kyle Fowle from The A.V. Club deemed "Face the Sun" a failed attempt at rock and "What's Normal Anyway" too blunt of a "self-love message" amidst the more subtle songs, while Spins Andrew Unterberger found the album somewhat inferior to Kaleidoscope Dream, even though he said it broadened that record's musical variety.

At the end of 2015, Wildheart was named the year's best album by Time magazine. On other year-end lists, it was ranked 11th best by The Guardian, 8th best by Pitchfork, and 28th best by Rolling Stone, who said it was both one of 2015's best R&B and psychedelic rock albums. Wildheart was also nominated for the 2016 Grammy Award for Best Urban Contemporary Album, while "Coffee" was nominated in the category of Best R&B Song.

Track listing 

Notes
  signifies a co-producer
 "Deal", "NWA" and "Flesh" are stylized in all upper-case letters. All other tracks, except "Hollywood Dreams" and "Simple Things", are stylized in all lower-case letters.
 "Leaves" contains a portion of the composition "1979", written by William Corgan, as performed by the Smashing Pumpkins.

Personnel 
Credits are adapted from AllMusic.

 Wayne Barrow – associate producer  
 Jasmine Benjamin – vocals  
 Benny Blanco – producer  
 Tanisha Broadwater – production coordination    
 Cashmere Cat – producer  
 Benny Cassette – producer  
 Ronald "Flippa" Colson – producer 
 Tom Coyne – mastering  
 Jack Davey – vocals 
 Dru DeCaro – guitar  
 Gleyder "Gee" Disla – engineer  
 Brook D'Leau – programming, vocals
 Fisticuffs – engineer, producer  
 Chris Galland – mixing assistant  
 Erwin Gorostiza – creative director  
 Katya Elise Henry – model  
 R.J. Kelly – drums  
 Lenny Kravitz – featured artist, guitar  
 Kurupt – featured artist  
 Nazanin Mandi – vocals  
 Manny Marroquin – mixing  

 Jennifer Martinez – model  
 Donnie Meadows – production coordination  
 Miguel – drum programming, engineer, executive producer, guitar, primary artist, producer  
 Steve Mostyn – producer  
 Nonchanlant Savant – vocals  
 Oakwud – producer  
 A. K. Paul – producer  
 Happy Perez – producer 
 Willo Perron – creative director  
 Mark Pitts – executive producer  
 Christian Plata – engineer, mixing  
 Zac Rae – keyboards  
 Salaam Remi – arranger, bass, drums, keyboards, producer 
 Brian Roettinger – art direction  
 Steve Rusch – engineer  
 Raphael Saadiq – bass, guitar, piano, producer, vibraphone  
 Daniel Sannwald – photography  
 Ike Schultz – mixing assistant  
 Jayme Silverstein – bass 
 Pop Wansel – producer

Charts

Weekly charts

Year-end charts

See also 
 List of number-one albums of 2015 (Canada)
 List of Billboard number-one R&B/hip-hop albums of 2015

References

External links 
 

2015 albums
Albums produced by Benny Blanco
Albums produced by Salaam Remi
Albums produced by Cashmere Cat
Albums produced by Oak Felder
Miguel (singer) albums
RCA Records albums